Ernest Cresswick (16 October 1867 – 23 September 1939) was an Australian cricketer. He played in two first-class matches for Queensland between 1894 and 1896.

See also
 List of Queensland first-class cricketers

References

External links
 

1867 births
1939 deaths
Australian cricketers
Queensland cricketers
Cricketers from Newcastle, New South Wales